Alec Kerr (1876 – 30 April 1953) was a New Zealand cricketer. He played seven first-class matches for Auckland between 1906 and 1913. His son, Allen, also played first-class cricket for Auckland.

See also
 List of Auckland representative cricketers

References

External links
 

1876 births
1953 deaths
New Zealand cricketers
Auckland cricketers